Mareuil-sur-Lay-Dissais is a commune in the Vendée department in the Pays de la Loire region in western France.

Geography
The river Smagne forms part of the commune's eastern border, then flows into the Lay, which flows southwestward through the commune and crosses the village.

Notables
Christophe de Margerie

See also
Communes of the Vendée department

References

Communes of Vendée